Jamukha was a Mongol military and political leader and the chief rival to Temüjin (later Genghis Khan) in the unification of the Mongol tribes.

Biography
Jamukha was born in the Jadaran, a sub-tribe of the Khamag Mongol confederation, and was an anda (i.e. blood brother) to Temüjin.

According to The Secret History of the Mongols, when Börte, wife of Temüjin, was abducted by the Three Merkits; Wang Khan, Jamukha and Temüjin combined forces against the Merkits to recover her.

In 1201, the leaders of the thirteen remaining tribes hostile to Temüjin (among them the Merkits, Tatar, and Naimans) and the Mongol tribes not allied with him (Jadaran, Taichuud, and others) assembled a kurultai and elected Jamukha as Gur-khan, universal ruler, a title used by the rulers of the Kara-Khitan Khanate. Jamukha's assumption of this title was the final breach between Temüjin and Jamukha, leading Temüjin to form a coalition of tribes to oppose him. In the fall of that year, a great battle broke out between Jamukha's alliance and the Keraite-Khamag Mongol alliance at the Ergune valley. This decisive battle, known as the Battle of the Thirteen Sides, ended with Temüjin's victory and eventual ascension as Khan of all united Mongol tribes.

Jamukha was less successful in building a coalition. For example, he did not recruit shepherds who lacked tribal status in the Mongol tradition, which allowed Temüjin to recover from a series of military defeats inflicted by Jamukha and to emerge victorious.

Following the Battle of the Thirteen Sides, Jamukha was betrayed and captured by his own men, who submitted him to the now-victorious Temüjin. Due to one of the laws which Temüjin came up with ("Never betray your Khan"), he had the men immediately executed and later Jamukha interrogated. Jamukha was given a choice to live and join Temüjin, but he instead requested to die in his blood-brother's hands, and thus was soon after executed "without spilling any blood".

In popular culture 
Jamukha is a major character in the 1965 film Genghis Khan, portrayed by Stephen Boyd, and the 2007 film Mongol, portrayed by Honglei Sun.  In The Conqueror, the screenplay depicts him as unfailingly loyal and subordinate to Temujin, but ends with him insisting on the bloodless execution (when Temujin swears to grant him any favor he requests), as opposed to the 1965 film, which depicts them as lifelong rivals and enemies who both perish in a climactic duel.

He appears (as "Jamuga") in the game Genghis Khan II by KOEI as a playable ruler.

References

Sources
Heirs to Discord: The Supratribal Aspirations of Jamuqa, Toghrul, and Temüjin 
Weatherford, Jack. Genghis Khan and the Making of the Modern World. New York: Three Rivers, 2005. Print.

Genghis Khan
13th-century Mongol rulers
1206 deaths
Year of birth unknown